Laura Pous Tió (born 1 October 1984) is a former professional tennis player from Spain.

Career
Pous Tió won the gold medal at the 2005 Mediterranean Games in Almería by defeating compatriot Nuria Llagostera Vives in straight sets. She won 20 ITF titles in singles and nine in doubles. At the WTA level, she was a singles runner-up at the Morocco Open in Fés, losing the final in two sets to Kiki Bertens. In 2007, she played a doubles match for the Spanish Fed Cup team against Russia. Pous Tió reached her career-high singles ranking of No. 72 on 30 January 2012.

WTA career finals

Singles: 1 (runner-up)

Doubles: 1 (runner-up)

Grand Slam performance timelines

Singles

Doubles

ITF finals

Singles: 31 (20–11)

Doubles: 14 (9–5)

References

External links

 
 
 

1984 births
Spanish female tennis players
Living people
Doping cases in tennis
Spanish sportspeople in doping cases
Mediterranean Games gold medalists for Spain
Mediterranean Games silver medalists for Spain
Competitors at the 2005 Mediterranean Games
Competitors at the 2009 Mediterranean Games
Sportspeople from Granollers
Mediterranean Games medalists in tennis
Tennis players from Catalonia